Nancy Iza Moreno is a Kichwa leader and Coordinadora Andina de Organizaciones Indígenas organizer.

References

Ecuadorian people of Quechua descent
Quechua people
Living people
Year of birth missing (living people)
Place of birth missing (living people)